Built in 1835, the William Gunnell House is a contributing property of the City of Fairfax Historic District.  The building, at 10520 Main Street, was the location of Confederate John S. Mosby's raid on Union forces on March 9, 1863.

The William Gunnell House has been listed on the National Register of Historic Places since 1987.  The house is currently a private residence used for administrative offices of the adjacent Truro Anglican Church. The interior has not been significantly modified since its construction.

References

External links
 Mosby Heritage Area Tour, Fairfax Courthouse webpage

Houses in Fairfax, Virginia
Houses completed in 1835
Houses on the National Register of Historic Places in Virginia
National Register of Historic Places in Fairfax County, Virginia
Historic district contributing properties in Virginia